Planet Helpless is the third album by English alternative rock band Puressence, released in 2002. "Walking Dead" was the only single released from the album. The second single was penned as "She's Gotten Over You" but was not released due to the band leaving Island Records after Planet Helpless had been released.

Track listing
All songs written by Mudriczki, Szuminski, Matthews and McDonald.
"Walking Dead" – 3:25
"Prodigal Song" – 3:33
"How Does It Feel" – 3:06
"Analgesic Love Song" – 3:43
"She's Gotten Over You" – 3:26
"Make Time" – 3:27
"Planet Helpless" – 3:03
"Ironstone Izadora" – 3:31
"You Move Me" – 3:49
"Comfort When You Smile" – 4:03
"Strangers" – 3:09
"Heart of Gold" – 3:46
"Throw Me a Line" – 3:30

Personnel

Musicians
James Mudriczki - vocals
Neil McDonald - guitar
Kevin Matthews - bass
Anthony Szuminski - drums

Technical 
Clive Martin - producer and engineer
Peter Anderson - Photography

2002 albums
Puressence albums
Island Records albums